Broadway Bridge may refer to:

Canada
 Broadway Bridge (Saskatoon), in Saskatoon, Saskatchewan

United Kingdom
 Broadway Bridge (Liverpool), in Liverpool, Merseyside

United States

 Broadway Bridge (Clarkdale, Arizona), listed on the National Register of Historic Places (NRHP) in Yavapai County
 Broadway Bridge (Little Rock), in Arkansas
 Broadway Bridge (Denver, Colorado), in Colorado
 Broadway Bridge (Daytona Beach), in Florida
 Buck O'Neil Bridge, in Kansas City, Missouri, formerly and also called the Broadway Bridge
 Broadway Bridge (Little Falls), in Minnesota
 Broadway Bridge (Manhattan), in New York
 Broadway Bridge (Portland, Oregon), in Oregon
 Broadway Bridge (St. Peter, Minnesota), NRHP-listed in Nicollet County and in Le Sueur County
 Broadway Bridge (Greenville, Ohio), NRHP-listed

See also
 Broadway Avenue Bridge in Minneapolis, Minnesota
 Broadway (disambiguation)